Wallace William Brigden (8 June 1916 – 11 March 2008) was a British cardiologist who pioneered new treatments for heart disease after the Second World War.

He is buried at St Andrew's church, Totteridge, London.

References 

1916 births
2008 deaths
St Andrew's church, Totteridge
British cardiologists
People from Ealing